Kumler Hall is a historic dormitory that was part of the Brainerd Institute, in Chester, Chester County, South Carolina. Brainerd Institute was one of the earliest and finest of the many private schools established for African-American freedmen in South Carolina in the years just after the American Civil War. The school operated from about 1868 until 1940 by the Board of Missions of the Presbyterian Church.  

Kumler Hall was built about 1916, and is a brick two-story boys dormitory.  It has a central longitudinal hallway opening onto the porch, with a central single-flight stairway and classrooms and dormitory rooms opening on either side on both floors and the basement.

It was listed on the National Register of Historic Places in 1983.

References

External links 

African-American history of South Carolina
Residential buildings on the National Register of Historic Places in South Carolina
Residential buildings completed in 1916
Buildings and structures in Chester County, South Carolina
National Register of Historic Places in Chester County, South Carolina